Consolida regalis, known as forking larkspur, rocket-larkspur, and field larkspur, is an annual herbaceous plant belonging to the genus Consolida of the buttercup family (Ranunculaceae).

Distribution
Consolida regalis is native to: 
Western Asia: Turkey, Georgia, western Siberia.
Northern Europe — Denmark; Finland; Sweden; Estonia; Latvia; Lithuania.
Middle Europe — Austria; Belgium; Czech Republic; Germany; Hungary; Netherlands; Poland; Slovakia; Switzerland.
East Europe — Belarus; Estonia; Latvia; Moldova; Russian Federation—European part; Ukraine.
Southeastern Europe — Albania; Bosnia and Herzegovina; Bulgaria; Croatia; Greece; Italy; Macedonia; Montenegro; Romania; Serbia; Slovenia.
Southwestern Europe — France.

Habitat
The plant is found growing on sandy or chalky soils.

It grows in dry weedy places and roadside ditches, and in cereal crop fields. The plant has become quite rare in central and southern Europe because of the increased use of herbicides and intensive soil cultivation. 

This species is grown as an ornamental plant.

Description
Consolida regalis reaches on average  in height. The stem is erect, hairy and very branched at the top. The leaves are alternately arranged. 

The inflorescence is a cluster with five to eight hermaphrodite flowers. The flowers are dark blue or purple with five sepals. There are eight to ten stamens. The flowering period extends from May through August. 

The flowers are pollinated by hymenoptera and lepidoptera. The seeds ripen from June through September. All plant parts are poisonous in large doses, especially the seeds, that contain up to 1.4% of alkaloids.

Chemical constituents
The alkaloids which have been isolated from Consolida regalis include

aicolorine

atisine

corepanine

delcoridine

delcosine

delsoline

gigactonine

hetisinone

lycoctonine

paniculine

regaline

takaosamine

Gallery

References

 Pignatti S. - Flora d'Italia - Edagricole – 1982 - Vol. I, pag. 291
Consolida regalis

External links

Global Species — Consolida regalis

regalis
Flora of Europe
Flora of Western Asia
Butterfly food plants
Garden plants of Asia
Garden plants of Europe